The Ultra Low Emission Zone (ULEZ) is an area in London, England where a fee is charged for driving the most polluting vehicles.

Plans were laid out under Mayor Boris Johnson and introduced by Sadiq Khan in April 2019 in Central London, covering the same area as the congestion charge. In the four months following its introduction there was a 20% reduction in emissions in Central London and the number of the worst polluting vehicles dropped from 35,600 to 23,000. 

However, some research suggests the ULEZ caused only small improvements to air quality.

In August 2023 it will extend to cover all of Greater London.

Current charging scheme
The £12.50 charge applies 24 hours a day every day of the year, and is based on European emission standards:

    Motorbikes that do not meet Euro 3 standards (most vehicles pre-2007)
    Petrol cars and vans that do not meet Euro 4 standards (most vehicles pre-2006)
    Diesel cars and vans that do not meet Euro 6 standards (most vehicles pre-2015)
    Buses, coaches and lorries must meet or exceed the Euro VI standard or pay £100 a day

History and planned extension

Plans for an ultra–low emission zone were under consideration since 2014 under Mayor Boris Johnson. In February 2017, Mayor Sadiq Khan announced plans to expand the Ultra Low Emission Zone in April 2019 beyond Central London, one year ahead of schedule. Drivers do not pay both the ULEZ and the previous £10 T-charge, but they are still subject to the London Congestion Charge. The money raised from the ULEZ is invested in the transport network and improving air quality in London.

October 2021 expansion
The zone was expanded to cover the Inner London area inside the North and South Circular roads on 25 October 2021 so that it covers an area containing 3.8 million people. Around a million vehicles a day drive in the expanded zone, but Tfl estimated that 87% already complied with the emissions rules, meaning nearly 140,000 vehicles would have to be replaced or pay the charge, including 100,000 cars, 35,000 vans and 3,000 lorries.

There was a scrappage scheme to help those on income support or disability benefit to get rid of their old vehicle. This was used to scrap at least 12,000 vehicles. The Mayor said on 14 October 2021 that there was less than £2 million left in the £61m fund. 

A month into the expansion, TfL said that the proportion of compliant vehicles had risen from 87% to 92%, and the number of the most polluting vehicles had fallen by over a third (from 127,000 to 80,000 on weekdays). They also said that 94% of cars complied compared to 78% of vans.
Six months after the expansion, TfL estimated that NOx in Inner London was 20% lower than it would have been without the expansion and found that 95% of cars and 83% of vans now met the standard.

August 2023 expansion
The zone will be expanded in August 2023 to cover all of Greater London. TfL estimates 20,000 to 40,000 vehicles will be taken off the road due to the expansion. Khan said "This is also a matter of social justice – with air pollution hitting the poorest communities the hardest. Nearly half of Londoners don’t own a car, but they are disproportionally feeling the damaging consequences polluting vehicles are causing."

Critics argue the expansion disproportionately impacts poorer Londoners, who are more likely to own an older, non-compliant vehicle that will be subject to the daily charge. 

TfL found that 60% of those who responded to its public consultation into the expansion plans were opposed, as well as 70% of outer London residents and 80% of outer London workers.

Effects

Effect on air pollution
The zone was introduced on 8 April 2019 and led to a 20% reduction in emissions by July 2019.

From 2016 to 2020, NO2 pollution dropped five times as quickly in Central London as it did in the rest of the UK.

However, a study from Imperial College London found the ULEZ caused only small improvements to air quality after it was implemented. It stated that there has been a longer-term downward trend in London’s air pollution levels and argued that the ULEZ on its own is not an effective strategy for improving air quality.

Effect on vehicle numbers
The number of the worst polluting vehicles entering the zone each day dropped from 35,578, in March 2019, to 26,195 in April of the same year, after the charge was introduced.  The number further dropped to 23,054 in July 2019. The proportion of vehicles which complied with the standards rose from 61% in March 2019 to 74% in September 2019. It further rose to 85% in December 2020, including 90% for cars, and the number of non-compliant vehicles dropped to around 12,000 (of which 4,000 were exempt from the charges).

The total number of vehicles entering Central London each day also dropped from over 102,000 in February 2017 to 89,000 in April 2019.

Reaction
The Ultra Low Emission Zone has been described as one of the most radical anti-pollution policies in the world. A poll in April 2019 by YouGov found that 72% of Londoners supported using emissions charging to tackle both air pollution and congestion. However, the Federation of Small Businesses said that many small firms were "very worried about the future of their businesses" as a result of the "additional cost burden".

Exemptions
Residents of the zone did not pay the charge until October 2021 as long as they were registered for the residents' Congestion Charge discount and met the T-charge standards. Vehicles in the "disabled" tax class are exempt from the charge, as are London-licensed taxis, private hire vehicles which are wheelchair accessible and historic vehicles (over 40 years old). There are also exemptions for agricultural vehicles, military vehicles, certain types of mobile cranes and non-road going vehicles which are allowed to drive on the highway (e.g. excavators).

See also
Clean Air Zone
London Low Emission Zone (LEZ)

References

External links 
ULEZ.co.uk - ULEZ expansion
Transport for London - ULEZ: Where and when
Transport for London - ULEZ expansion

Electronic toll collection
Fare collection systems in London
Motoring taxation in the United Kingdom
Road congestion charge schemes in the United Kingdom
Road transport in London
Town and country planning in London
Transport policy in the United Kingdom
Transport infrastructure in London
2019 in London
2019 introductions
Congestion charge
Air pollution in the United Kingdom